Shekinah News TV is a 24-hour Indian satellite News channel, airing Christian spiritual programs, current affairs and news. Live telecasting  The channel airs programs in Malayalam and English. The channel is managed by Shekinah Communications Limited. The channel is headquartered in Thalikode, Thrissur, Kerala, India.

Satellite details

See also
Catholic television
Catholic television channels
Catholic television networks

References

External links
 TV

Malayalam-language television channels
Catholic television channels
Religious television channels in India
Television channels and stations established in 2010